This article is about the demographic features of the population of Palau, including population density, ethnicity, education level, health of the populace, economic status, religious affiliations and other aspects of the population.

About 70% of the Palauan population lives in the city of Koror on Koror Island. Koror is the former capital of the nation. The present capital is Ngerulmud, in Melekeok State on the bigger but less developed island of Babeldaob—the second-largest island in Micronesia after Guam.

Vital statistics

Births and deaths

CIA World Factbook demographic statistics 

The following demographic statistics are from the CIA World Factbook (2023 est.), unless otherwise indicated.

Population
21,779 (2023 est.)

Age structure

0-14 years: 17.49% (male 1,966/female 1,844)
15-64 years: 71.82% (male 8,665/female 6,976)
65 years and over: 10.69% (male 581/female 1,747) (2023 est.)

Population growth rate
0.39% (2023 est.)

Birth rate
11.57 births/1,000 population (2023 est.)

Death rate
8.31 deaths/1,000 population (2023 est.)

Net migration rate
0.64 migrant(s)/1,000 population (2023 est.)

Sex ratio
at birth: 1.07 male(s)/female
0-14 years: 1.07 male(s)/female
15-64 years: 1.24 male(s)/female
65 years and over: 0.33 male(s)/female
Total population: 1.06 male(s)/female (2023 est.)

Infant mortality rate
Total: 11.04 deaths/1,000 live births 
Male: 12.99 deaths/1,000 live births
Female: 8.98 deaths/1,000 live births (2023 est.)

Life expectancy at birth
Total population: 74.91 years 
Male: 71.76 years
Female: 78.24 years (2023 est.)

Total fertility rate
1.7 children born/woman (2023 est.)

Nationality
 Palauans (noun)
 Palauan (adjective)

Ethnic groups
Palauan (Micronesian with Malayan and Melanesian admixtures) 73% 
Carolinian 2%
Asian 21.7%
White 1.2%,
Other 2.1% (2020 est.)

Religions

Roman Catholic 45.3% 
Protestant 34.9% (includes Protestant (general) 26.4%)
Seventh-day Adventist 6.9%,
Other Protestant 1.6%
Modekngei 5.7% (indigenous to Palau)
Islam (Muslims) 3%
Mormonism 1.5%
Other 9.7%
(2015 est.)

Languages
Palauan (official on most islands) 65.2%
Other Micronesian 1.9%
English (official) 19.1%
Filipino 9.9%
Chinese 1.2%
Other 2.8% (2015 est.)

Literacy

Definition: age 15 and over can read and write
Total population: 96.6%
Male: 96.8%
Female: 96.3% (2015 est.)

References

 
Society of Palau

pt:Palau#Demografia